Rausch Creek is a tributary of Pine Creek in Schuylkill County, Pennsylvania, in the United States. The creek has two named tributaries: East Branch Rausch Creek and West Branch Rausch Creek. Rausch Creek is designated as an impaired waterbody, with the cause of the impairment being metals and the probable source being abandoned mine drainage.

Rausch Creek flows through a water gap, and several mountains are in the vicinity of the creek. The watershed of Rausch Creek experienced extensive deep mining in the early 20th century. There are still several active mining permits in the watershed. A treatment plant was constructed for the creek by the early 1970s.

Course
Rausch Creek begins at the confluence of the tributaries East Branch Rausch Creek and West Branch Rausch Creek in between two mountains in Hegins Township. It flows in a northerly direction for approximately a mile, passing through a water gap. The creek then reaches the end of the water gap and turns north-northwest, flowing through the valley of Pine Creek. Several tenths of a mile further downstream, it reaches its confluence with Pine Creek on the border of the census-designated place of Valley View.

Tributaries
Rausch Creek has two named tributaries: East Branch Rausch Creek and West Branch Rausch Creek.

Hydrology
Rausch Creek is designated as an impaired waterbody throughout its entire length. The cause of the impairment is metals and the probable source is abandoned mine drainage. The creek is a major contributor of abandoned mine drainage to Pine Creek, the largest tributary of Mahantango Creek. The iron load in the creek requires a 92 percent reduction to meet the creek's total maximum daily load requirements, while the manganese load requires a 78 percent reduction and the aluminum load requires an 83 percent reduction. The acidity load require a 91 percent reduction.

The pH of Rausch Creek at the influent of the Rausch Creek Treatment Plant has been measured to range from 3.9 to 8.8, with an average of 5.44. At the effluent of the treatment plant, the pH ranged from 6.2 to 8.0, with an average of 6.60.

Geography and geology

Rausch Creek flows through a water gap known as Kohlers Gap (or Bear Gap), where it is flanked by steep slopes. A number of abandoned deep mine openings occur in this reach. The tributary East Branch Rausch Creek flows between Big Lick Mountain and Good Springs Mountain, while the tributary West Branch Rausch Creek flows between Big Lick Mountain and Bear Mountain.

There are five large abandoned mine pools in the watershed of Rausch Creek. They are known as Brookside, Good Spring No. 1, Good Spring No. 3, Markson, and Williamstown-Lykens. However, the last of these does not discharge into the watershed, but instead goes through the Big Lick Tunnel to the watershed of Wiconisco Creek, and the Good Spring No. 3 pool discharges into Good Spring Creek, a tributary of Swatara Creek. Abandoned mine drainage discharges provide the bulk of the flow of the streams in the watershed of Rausch Creek.

Watershed and biology
The mouth of the creek is in the United States Geological Survey quadrangle of Valley View. However, its source is in the quadrangle of Tower City. The creek's mouth is located at Valley View.

The watershed of Rausch Creek is situated in the southwestern part of Schuylkill County. The watershed can be accessed by taking Interstate 81 to US Route 209 and US Route 209 to State Route 4011. Most of the watershed of the creek is contained within the subwatersheds of the tributaries East Branch Rausch Creek and West Branch Rausch Creek. The watershed has been described as having "rugged contours", reducing the viability of development, but is suitable for mining, hunting, and lumbering.

The designated use of Rausch Creek is aquatic life. The creek is classified as a Coldwater Fishery. The mouth of the creek is on the border of a Wild Pheasant Recovery Area.

Open thickets have been observed in the vicinity of Rausch Creek. In the early 1940s, Menziesia pilosa was observed in these thickets.

History
Rausch Creek was entered into the Geographic Names Information System on August 2, 1979. Its identifier in the Geographic Names Information System is 1184704.

Extensive deep mining took place in the watershed of Rausch Creek in the early 20th century. In particular, anthracite coal has been mined extensively in the watershed of the creek. In March 1969, the Pennsylvania Department of Mines and Mineral Resources commissioned Anthracite Research and Development Company, Inc. to devise a method to remedy abandoned mine drainage in the watershed. The treatment plant was one of 16 abandoned mine drainage treatment plants constructed by the Commonwealth of Pennsylvania, the Pennsylvania Department of Environmental Protection, the Pennsylvania Department of Environmental Resources, and the Department of Mines & Mineral Industries in the Anthracite and Bituminous Regions between 1967 and 1992.

As of 2001, there are eight active mining permits in the watershed of Rausch Creek. Five of them have neither an NPDES permit nor an NPDES discharge, while one has a permit but no discharge, and two have neither permits nor discharges.

See also
Deep Creek (Pine Creek), next tributary of Pine Creek going downstream
List of rivers of Pennsylvania

References

Rivers of Schuylkill County, Pennsylvania
Tributaries of Mahantango Creek
Rivers of Pennsylvania